The 21st Arizona State Legislature, consisting of the Arizona State Senate and the Arizona House of Representatives, was constituted in Phoenix from January 1, 1953, to December 31, 1954, during the last two years of John Howard Pyle's term as Governor of Arizona. The number of senators remained constant at 19, while the members of the house of representatives increased from 68 to 80. The Republicans picked up four Senate seats, leaving the Democrats in control of the upper house with a 15–4 margin.  In the House, the Republicans picked up nineteen seats, while the number of seats controlled by the Democrats decreased by seven, giving the Democrats a 50–30 edge.

Sessions
The Legislature met for two regular sessions at the State Capitol in Phoenix. The first opened on January 12, 1953; and adjourned on March 31, while the second convened on January 11, 1954, and adjourned on April 10. The only special session was convened on October 13, 1953, and adjourned sine die on November 3, 1953.

State Senate

Members

The asterisk (*) denotes members of the previous Legislature who continued in office as members of this Legislature.

** James W. Ewing died in office and was replaced by H. S. Corbett

House of Representatives

Members 
The asterisk (*) denotes members of the previous Legislature who continued in office as members of this Legislature.

The ** means that Elijah Allen died in office and was replaced by William S. Porter

References

Arizona legislative sessions
1953 in Arizona
1954 in Arizona
1953 U.S. legislative sessions
1954 U.S. legislative sessions